Brendan Keogh (born 1970) is an Irish former hurler who played as a left wing-forward for the Galway senior team.    

Keogh joined the team during the 1991 championship and was a regular member of the team for six seasons. An All-Ireland medalist in the under-21 grade, he won three Connacht winners' medals and one National Hurling League winners' medal at senior level. He ended up as an All-Ireland runner-up on one occasion. 

At club level Keogh is an All-Ireland medalist with Athenry. In addition to this he has also won seven Connacht and county club championship winners' medals.

References

1970 births
Living people
Athenry hurlers
Galway inter-county hurlers
Connacht inter-provincial hurlers